98s is a British hip-hop collective based in Hackney, London. The group is named after the two postcodes, E9 (Homerton) and E8 (Holly Street), where the members are from. Their members include V9, Unknown T, Kay-O (formerly KO), HitMan, DA, Jimmy, Stally, Alchubbino, Billy Billions, and Mazza. They released their debut album, Class of 98s, on 24 September 2020.

History
98s is a collective of friends from Homerton and Holly Street in Hackney, London. On 4 November 2019, the group appeared on Tim Westwood's "Crib Session" for a cipher on his show. Individual members such as V9, Unknown T, and KO (now known as Kay-O) had success as solo artists before the collective formed in 2020, with the mixtapes Yūdokuna, Rise Above Hate, and Drilliam Shakespeare. On 6 August 2020, the 98s made their debut as a group with the single "Homerton2Holly". Their second and third singles, "Taco" and "Pay Attention," were released on 27 August and 10 September. On 24 September 2020, they released their debut album, Class of 98s. On 12 February 2021, they released the single "WeDa1s".

Members

The list below includes confirmed members of 98s 

 Alchubbino
 Billy Billions
 DA
 HitMan
 Jimmy
 Kay-O (formerly KO)
 Mazza
 Smokes
 Stally
 Unknown T
 V9

the Discography

Studio albums

Singles

Individual discography

References

Hip hop collectives
English hip hop groups
UK drill musicians